Alexander is a city in McKenzie County, North Dakota, United States. The population was 319 at the 2020 census. Alexander was founded in 1905 and is named after early North Dakota politician Alexander McKenzie.

Geography

Demographics

2010 census
As of the census of 2010, there were 223 people, 100 households, and 60 families residing in the city. The racial makeup of the city was 91.5% White, 1.8% African American, 4.9% Native American, 0.4% from other races, and 1.3% from two or more races. Hispanic or Latino of any race were 4.9% of the population.

There were 100 households, of which 21.0% had children under the age of 18 living with them, 48.0% were married couples living together, 5.0% had a female householder with no husband present, 7.0% had a male householder with no wife present, and 40.0% were non-families. 32.0% of all households were made up of individuals, and 15% had someone living alone who was 65 years of age or older. The average household size was 2.23 and the average family size was 2.82.

The median age in the city was 43.3 years. 18.4% of residents were under the age of 18; 9% were between the ages of 18 and 24; 25.1% were from 25 to 44; 32.3% were from 45 to 64; and 15.2% were 65 years of age or older. The gender makeup of the city was 55.6% male and 44.4% female.

2000 census
As of the census of 2000, there were 217 people, 87 households, and 60 families residing in the city. The population density was 150.6 people per square mile (58.2/km). There were 106 housing units at an average density of 73.6 per square mile (28.4/km). The racial makeup of the city was 93.55% White, 5.99% Native American, 0.46% from other races. Hispanic or Latino of any race were 1.38% of the population.

The top 6 ancestry groups in the city are Norwegian (49.3%), German (32.7%), Irish (18.0%), English (8.3%), Swedish (7.4%), Dutch (4.1%).

There were 87 households, out of which 32.2% had children under the age of 18 living with them, 59.8% were married couples living together, 4.6% had a female householder with no husband present, and 31.0% were non-families. 28.7% of all households were made up of individuals, and 10.3% had someone living alone who was 65 years of age or older. The average household size was 2.49 and the average family size was 3.08.

The median income for a household in the city was $26,042, and the median income for a family was $35,625. Males had a median income of $25,000 versus $20,000 for females. The per capita income for the city was $11,630. About 15.9% of families and 20.3% of the population were below the poverty line, including 24.7% of those under the age of eighteen and 21.1% of those 65 or over.

North Dakota's Bakken Oil Boom's Impact
See main article

Notable person

 Arthur A. Link (May 24, 1914 - June 1, 2010), 27th  Governor of North Dakota

Climate
According to the Köppen climate classification system, Alexander has a semi-arid to humid continental climate, abbreviated "BSk" to "DFb" on climate maps.

References

Cities in North Dakota
Cities in McKenzie County, North Dakota
Populated places established in 1905
1905 establishments in North Dakota